Fernando Cruz (born 15 February 1953) is a former Colombian cyclist. He competed in the individual road race and team time trial events at the 1972 Summer Olympics.

References

External links
 

1953 births
Living people
Colombian male cyclists
Olympic cyclists of Colombia
Cyclists at the 1972 Summer Olympics
Place of birth missing (living people)